The Morrow Group was a geologic group in Arkansas that is now abandoned and replaced by the Bloyd Formation and the Hale Formation. It preserves fossils dating back to the Pennsylvanian period.

See also

 List of fossiliferous stratigraphic units in Arkansas
 Paleontology in Arkansas

References

References

Carboniferous System of North America
Geologic groups of Arkansas